Patrick "Pat" Vasquez-Vegas (born March 17, 1941) is a Mexican-American musician of Yaqui/Shoshone descent, vocalist, writer, and producer of Redbone, known for their hit singles "Come and Get Your Love", "The Witch Queen of New Orleans", "Maggie", and "We Were All Wounded at Wounded Knee". He has played in numerous ensembles which include Pat and Lolly Vegas, The Avantis, and Redbone. Vegas, along with his Redbone bandmates, was featured in the Smithsonian National Museum of the American Indian for being the first rock/Cajun group of Native American ancestry to have a No. 1 single.

Background
Pat Vegas was born in Coalinga, California. He was originally known as Patrick Vasquez-Vegas. Both Pat and his brother Candido "Lolly" Vasquez-Vegas played in local bands. They changed their name to Vegas when they came to Los Angeles in 1960 to work as musicians.
Vegas started out as a member of the Shindig house band. Later he performed with his brother Lolly as The Vegas Brothers. After that they formed the group Redbone which had the 1974 hit, "Come and Get Your Love".

Career
In 1961, Vegas released a single, "I Wanna Be A Movie Star". The following year, "That Smile" b/w "The Best Girl in the World" was released on the Unity label.

Pat and Lolly led a band called The Avantis. The line-up included drummer Mike Kowalski and guitarist Danny Hamilton. They became a support act for the Beach Boys. The Avantis worked closely with Judd Hamilton (Older brother of Dan Hamilton) who was the arranger and co-composer on their records. In 1963, they had a minor hit with "Wax 'Em Down". On 12 October 1963 the record reached 36 in the Canadian charts.

In 1969, along with his brother Lolly, rhythm guitarist Tony Bellamy and drummer Pete DePoe, he formed the band Redbone which produced the hit songs, "Maggie", "The Witch Queen of New Orleans" and "Come And Get Your Love".

Later years
Vegas was featured in the 2017 film Rumble: The Indians Who Rocked the World, a documentary which explores the influence that Native Americans had on rock ’n’ roll.
In April 2018, CBC Music announced that Vegas as well as Ansley Simpson and Indian City were to perform at the CBC Indigenous Music Awards in Winnipeg in May.
Also, Vegas was the recipient of a Lifetime Achievement Award for his work in Redbone which inspired many Native American artists to find success in mainstream genres.

Solo discography

Albums
Speed of Sound (2013)(as "Ambergris")

Singles

References

Further reading 
 "Come And Get Your Love: A Celebratory Ode to Redbone (1939–Present)" by Pat “Redbone” Vegas, Rehbon Publishing, 2017, 280 pps.
 "King Kong Pete: Redbone and Beyond" by Peter "Last Walking Bear" DePoe, King Kong Beat Publishing, 2017, 292 pps.

External links
 Punchland: Interview: Pat Vegas of Redbone
 Discogs: Pat Vegas

American people of Shoshone descent
American people of Yaqui descent
Mexican bass guitarists
Male bass guitarists
Living people
Surf musicians
Mexican rock musicians
Rock bass guitarists
People from Fresno, California
1946 births
Redbone (band) members
The Avantis members
Mexican male guitarists